Magen David Synagogue may refer to:

Magen David Synagogue (Brooklyn), New York, U.S.
Magen David Synagogue (Byculla), India
Magen David Synagogue (Kolkata), India